Fermont is a town in northeastern Quebec, Canada, near the Quebec-Labrador border about  from Labrador City on Route 389, which connects to the Trans-Labrador Highway (Newfoundland and Labrador Route 500).  It is the seat of the Regional County Municipality of Caniapiscau.

The town is notable for the huge self-contained structure containing apartments, stores, schools, bars, a hotel, restaurants, a supermarket and swimming pool; the large building shelters a community of smaller apartment buildings and homes on its leeward side. Popularly known as The Wall (Le Mur), the structure was designed to be a windscreen to the rest of the town. It permits residents (other than mine workers) to never leave the building during the long winter, which usually lasts about seven months. The town, designed by Maurice Desnoyers and Norbert Schoenauer, was inspired by similar projects in Sweden designed by Ralph Erskine, notably that of Svappavaara, an iron mining town in Sweden.

History
Following the depletion of the Jeannine Lake Mine at Gagnon in the late 1960s, the Québec Cartier Mining Company began to develop the Mont Wright Mine. This was a large-scale project that involved mining, processing, and transporting iron ore. Some 1,600 employees would be needed, and the town of Fermont was constructed to house them and their families. By the end of 1972, the first people settled there. The same year, the Fermont post office opened, and in 1974, the place was incorporated as Ville de Fermont. The town, mine and wall were featured in the television crime drama series La Faille (2019).

Demographics 

With French being the dominant language within the community, Fermont is the world's northernmost Francophone settlement of any considerable size, being located about one degree of latitude north of Dunkirk. Although fluency in French is common in Nunavik and other points north, most in that region have adopted English as their primary language for communication outside their communities. In addition, a Franco-Yukonnais community can be found in Dawson City, Yukon, but it forms only a minority of the total population.

Fermont can also be considered the northernmost town to speak a Romance language.

City council
The city council is composed of a mayor and six city councillors. As of October 2020 the mayor is Martin St-Laurent, and the councillors are Bernard Dupont, Danny Bouchard, Cindy Vignola, Marco Ouellet, Daniel Bergeron, and Shannon Power.

Economy

The local economy is entirely dependent on the Mont Wright and Fire Lake mines owned by ArcelorMittal. Over 80% of municipal revenues come from mining operations.

Average earnings for full-time workers was $63,982 in 2001, compared to $39,217 in Quebec as a whole. This went up to $70,102 in 2006, whereas the provincial average dropped to $37,722.

The mine product is shipped to Port-Cartier on the Cartier Railway where it is converted to pellets. In 2006 the mine was affected by a labour dispute which lasted from early April to early June. It was amicably resolved with a six-year contract renewal.

Because of the town's disproportionately high number of (relatively prosperous) men compared to women and the few entertainment options in Fermont's climate, the adult entertainment industry is extremely lucrative in Fermont, and strippers can make a substantial amount of money for their profession.

Environment

Fermont is in an area of rounded hills and flat areas with peat bogs, wetlands and many lakes and small streams. The valleys show the influence of glacial action and contain undifferentiated glacial till and fluvioglacial deposits of sand and gravel. Lake Perchard, to the north of Fermont, supplies the town with drinking water. The Fermont waste water treatment plant discharges through lakes Daviault and Sans-Nom into Carheil Lake, in the Moisie River watershed. In April 2011 it was reported that water management experts in Sept-Îles were concerned about cyanobacteria, or blue-green algae, that had been found in Carheil Lake and had potential to further affect the Moisie River. The bloom was due to phosphorus discharge from the treatment plant, which has since been reduced.

Fermont has a harsh subarctic climate (Köppen Dfc) with long, severe winters and short, mild summers.

See also
 List of towns in Quebec

References

Sources

External links

 City of Fermont official site 
 Official tourism site
 Map
 Additional photos
 Original site plan by Norbert Schoenauer
 Preparatory drawings and photographs during the development phase (Schoenauer papers at McGill). 
 Documentary about innovative community design which features Fermont as an example
 Mur-Écran, The Windscreen on the CBC's Ideas.

Cities and towns in Quebec
Incorporated places in Côte-Nord
Populated places established in the 1970s
Mining communities in Quebec
Planned cities in Canada